Jawaani is a 1984 Indian Hindi-language film produced and directed by Ramesh Behl, starring Sharmila Tagore, Anupam Kher, Moushumi Chatterjee and introduces Neelam Kothari along with Karan Shah and Jatin Malhotra. The film  has the chartbuster song "Tu Rootha To Main Ro Doongi Sanam", sung by Asha Bhosle and Amit Kumar.

Plot

Jawaani is a triangular love story with strong family bonds.
The film mainly focuses around Karan Shah and Neelam Kothari and has a guest appearance from Jeetu Sawan.

Soundtrack

Cast

Sharmila Tagore as Sushma
Neelam Kothari as Sanam Malhotra 
Karan Shah as Karan Nath
Navin Nischol as Amar Nath, Karan's father 
Moushumi Chatterjee as Prema Mohan
Anupam Kher as Surendra Malhotra, Sanam's father
Sadashiv Amrapurkar as Uncle Joe
Narendra Nath as Vishnu Dada

References

External links
 

1984 films
1980s Hindi-language films
Indian action films
Films scored by R. D. Burman
Rose Audio Visuals
Films directed by Ramesh Behl
1984 action films